The University Royal Naval Units (URNU) (less commonly  ) (formerly Universities' Royal Naval Units) are Royal Navy training establishments who recruit Officer Cadets from a university or a number of universities, usually concentrated in one geographical area. There are 17 URNUs in the UK, with each URNU having land-based facilities near the universities they recruit from, with the exception of URNU Virtual, whose drill nights are conducted virtually.

Each unit has an affiliated P2000 ship, which is used for training Officer Cadets when not on duty with the Coastal Forces Squadron.

Units 

URNU ships are part of the Coastal Forces Squadron, or "CFS". CFS is commanded by Commander CFS, who previously was also Commander URNU, Commander Universities now being a separate post. The mission statement of CFS is to provide high-quality sea training experiences in support of the URNU mission and to deliver P2000 operational capability in support of other fleet tasking.

History

1967 – 1999
The URNU programme was founded in 1967, with the formation of the Aberdeen Universities' Royal Naval Unit (now URNU East Scotland) in Aberdeen, Scotland, to encourage STEM undergraduates to join the Royal Navy from the University of Aberdeen and Robert Gordon University.

This was followed 5 years later in 1972, with the introduction of Glasgow & Strathclyde URNU (Now URNU Glasgow) and Liverpool URNU, which also served universities with a high number of STEM undergraduates.

After being male-only units for their first 20 years, the URNUs finally allowed women to join their ranks in 1987, with the Aberdeen URNU being the first to do so.

In 1999, (then) Lt Mel Robinson and (then) Lt Suzanne Moore became the first women to hold command of a Royal Navy vessel, with their commands of Cardiff URNU (now URNU Wales) and Bristol URNU, as well as their attached P2000s, HMS Express and HMS Dasher respectively.

2000 – present
URNU Officer Cadets have been attending the exercise every year since, with the exception of 2022, due to increased tensions in the region following the re-escalation of the Russo-Ukrainian War.

Devon URNU was established in the autumn of 2017, catering to universities across the region. Devon was the first new unit formed since 1994.

In 2021 there was a further expansion of the URNU, with new units in East Midlands, Belfast, Solent and Virtual. Solent URNU was a merging of Southampton URNU and Sussex URNU, the unit more to a brand new location in Portsmouth where it could be inside HMNB Portsmouth. East Midlands URNU and Belfast URNU were both new units to cover holes in the coverage of URNU units where there are also large numbers of potential students. Virtual URNU was also setup after a year and half of online URNU to cater to those unable to get to a unit due to distance or any other issue.

In late 2021, there was a nation-wide naming change of the URNUs. They were formerly styled '[Location] URNU' (e.g. Edinburgh URNU), being changed by the end of the year to 'URNU [Location]' (e.g. URNU Edinburgh).

In January 2022, after striking an agreement with HMS Scotia, Tay Division, (the then) URNU Edinburgh opened a satellite division known now as URNU East Scotland, Tayside Division (often abbreviated to Tay Div), named for the Firth of Tay which runs just south of Dundee, the city in which the division is based. It is based out of a Royal Marines Reserve base in the north of the city centre. Its foundation was a first for the URNU programme and has become the testbed for a potential scheme to extend the URNU footprint.

Membership

Command Structure & Staff
The URNUs are part of the University Service Units, under the command of Commander Universities. They fall under the overall jurisdiction of the Commanding Officer of Britannia Royal Naval College, Dartmouth, Captain BRNC.

Each URNU is commanded by its commanding officer (CO), usually a full-time Royal Navy Lieutenant, Lieutenant Commander or Royal Marines Captain. The remainder of its full-time staff consists of the unit Coxswain (Cox'n or Coxn), usually a full-time Chief Petty Officer, Royal Marines Colour Sergeant or, exceptionally, a Royal Navy or Royal Marines Warrant Officer, as well as a Unit Administration Officer (UAO), who is a civilian and does not wear uniform.

Each unit also has the capacity for up to eight training officers, who may be ex-Navy, former URNU students, or civilians with relevant experience, who are appointed as honorary Royal Naval Reserve officers, though they do not hold a commission or require an Admiralty Interview Board (AIB) pass.

The training staff of an individual unit consists of a Royal Naval Reserve Lieutenant as the unit's Senior Training Officer (STO) and a number of Training Officers (TOs), who vary between Royal Naval Reserve Acting Sub-Lieutenants, Sub-Lieutenants and Lieutenants. This format, with the exception of rank, roughly mirrors the training staff and format of BRNC.

URNU training officers now wear the reserves' 'R' inside their executive curl to show their status as honorary officers. Some are being given the opportunity to attend AIBs and pass out of the reserve's Accelerated Officer Programme.

Officer Cadets
Undergraduates usually join for 3 years, with options to extend this membership to 4 or 5 years, providing they can sufficiently convince their Commanding Officer thet their continued membership would be of value to the unit. Members are list 7B reservists and therefore there is no call-up liability and members may leave at any time.

Each URNU comprises 51 students, who usually join for the duration of their degree, with the option of taking a year out or leaving at any time. The URNU's also have attached cadets that are on Navy sponsorship/cadetship programs.

Ranks
During their first year, URNU students wear URNU tabs on their shoulders and are Acting Officer Cadets (A/OC). On completion of their first year they receive a white officer cadet tab in addition to the URNU slide and are referred to as substantive Officer Cadets (OC). On completion of their second year students will wear Midshipman rank slides in addition to URNU tabs and are referred to as Acting Midshipmen (A/Mid).

URNU OCs work through training logs and receive training credits (formerly task books) but these no longer correspond to the URNU ranks, which are promoted based on a minimum time spent attending training per year.

To achieve the substansive rank of Midshipman the URNU OC must pass out of BRNC via the reserve or regular courses.

Committee
Each URNU has a senior midshipman (SMid) and deputy senior midshipman (DSMid) (known as the Vice-President or 'VP' in URNU Glasgow due to their role as mess vice-president) supported by a committee, made up of various roles, which differ according to unit but will generally include a treasurer and sports and adventurous training officers alongside other roles.

This committee will take a leading role in programme planning and assist in the running of the unit.

Training and unit life

Training focuses on leadership, navigation and seamanship, and this is put into practice during sea weekends, and longer deployments during the summer and Easter vacations. Drill nights also often include lessons on wider navy knowledge, drill practice, and visits from serving personnel and affiliated units as well as practical leadership tasks and team building. Units also frequently undertake visits to affiliated units and local training establishments to experience military life first hand.

There is also a significant and important social element to URNU life from formal mess dinners including the main naval formal event of the year, Trafalgar Night, to informal socialising in the unit's mess which contribute to unit integration and may be coordinated by a dedicated social secretary. Additionally, Scottish URNUs hold an annual Burns night dinner.

There are sporting activities held within the URNU units, informal contests between the units and an annual sports weekend in Portsmouth between all units.

See also
University Officer Training Corps, the British Army equivalent
University Air Squadron, the Royal Air Force equivalent
Naval Reserve Officers Training Corps, the United States equivalent
Defence Technical Undergraduate Scheme

References

External links

Naval education and training in the United Kingdom
University organisations of the British Armed Forces
University Royal Naval Units